The Vilnius trolleybus system is the one of two existing trolleybus systems in Lithuania. It operates in the capital city of Vilnius, the municipal operator company is Vilniaus viešasis transportas Ltd. 188 trolleybuses are working on working-days, 106 - on weekends.

History
In October 1956 , Vilnius Trolleybus Board was established and a 7.8 km long contact network was built, together with a trolleybus park for 25 trolleybuses. In November 1956, first model "MTB-82D" trolleybuses started to work and drove on route "Antakalnis–Railway station".

In 1981, the trolleybus count doubled the maximum service power of the old trolleybus park, thus, encouraging a construction of the second park. The second trolleybus park was opened on 28 December 1985, in the neighborhood of Viršuliškės and it could maintain 150 trolleybuses.

In April 1993, the board was reorganized to UAB "Vilniaus Autobusai" and the owner of the new company was the Vilnius city municipality. From the treasury of the municipality, new "Škoda" trolleybuses were bought in 1996–1999.

From 2004 to 2006, 45 new Polish trolleybuses "Solaris Trollino 15AC" were bought.

On 4 November 2011, the company was again reorganized and incorporated into UAB "Vilniaus Viešasis Transportas".

In 2012, new Lithuanian "MAZ-ETON Amber 203T Vilnis 12AC" trolleybuses were made and bought by the company.

In 2018 and 2019, 41 "Solaris Trollino 12" trolleybuses were bought.

Trolleybuses

Currently used 
Škoda 14Tr - 149 units, since 1992
Škoda 14TrM - 23 units, since 1999
Škoda 15Tr – 3 units, since 1991
Solaris Trollino II 15AC – 45 units, since 2004
Amber 203T Vilnis 12AC – 2 units, since 2012
Solaris Trollino IV 12 Škoda – 41 units, since 2018

Formerly used 

 MTB-82D – 63 units, 1956-?
Škoda 8Tr – 15 units, 1960-?
Škoda 9Tr - many units, 1967-2006 
 Gräf & Stift GE110 – 2 units, 1992-1999
 Jelcz PNTKM – 1 unit, 1998-2011
 Škoda 11Tr – 1 unit, 2000
 Belkamunmash AKSM-420 Vitovt – 1 unit, 2010

Routes

See also

List of trolleybus systems

References

External links
 Official website 

Vilnius
Trolleybus transport in Lithuania
Transport in Vilnius
Bus transport in Vilnius